Tony Bloncourt (1921–March 9, 1942) was a Haitian communist who joined the French Resistance against Nazi occupation in World War II. A member of the Union of Communist Students (French: Union des étudiants communistes, UEC), he was executed as part of the Procès du Palais Bourbon along with six other members of the Bataillons de la Jeunesse for his participation.

References 

 Albert Ouzoulias, Les Bataillons de la Jeunesse, éditions Sociales, 1972 
 Éric Alary, Mars 1942. Un procès au Palais-Bourbon, éditions de l'Assemblée nationale, 2000 (préface de Jean-Pierre Azéma)

External links 
 http://www.une-autre-histoire.org/tony-bloncourt-biographie/
 :fr:Procès du Palais Bourbon
 :fr:Gilbert Brustlein

1921 births
1942 deaths
French Resistance members
Haitian communists
Resistance members killed by Nazi Germany
Haitian expatriates in France